Multi-configuration time-dependent Hartree (MCTDH) is a general algorithm to solve the time-dependent Schrödinger equation for multidimensional dynamical systems consisting of distinguishable particles. MCTDH can thus determine the quantal motion of the nuclei of a molecular system evolving on one or several  coupled electronic potential energy surfaces. MCTDH by its very nature is an approximate method. However, it can be made as accurate as any competing method, but its numerical efficiency deteriorates with growing accuracy.

MCTDH is designed for multi-dimensional problems, in particular for problems that are difficult or even impossible to attack in a conventional way. There is no or only little gain when treating systems with less than three degrees of freedom by MCTDH. MCTDH will in general be best suited for systems with 4 to 12 degrees of freedom. Because of hardware limitations it may in general not be possible to treat much larger systems. For a certain class of problems, however, one can go much further. The MCTDH program package has recently been generalised to enable the propagation of density operators.

References

External links
The Heidelberg MCTDH Homepage

Quantum chemistry
Scattering